Ankyrin repeat and sterile alpha motif domain-containing protein 1B is a protein that in humans is encoded by the ANKS1B gene.

References

External links

Further reading